Slideware may refer to:
 A Presentation program, such as Microsoft PowerPoint, OpenOffice.org Impress or Apple iWork Keynote
 the paper copy materials distributed as part of a slideshow
 Vaporware, termed pejoratively when the product exists only in marketing promotions